Michael Buchberger (8 June 1874, Jetzendorf – 10 June 1961, Straubing) was a Roman Catholic priest, notable as the seventy-fourth bishop of Regensburg since the diocese's foundation in 739.

Life

Buchberger was ordained as a priest on 29 June 1900. In November 1923 Pope Pius XI promoted him to the rank of "Bishop" in the diocese Munich-Freising. On 24 January 1924 he was ordained as a bishop by Cardinal Faulhaber. From 12 March 1928 until his death, he was the Bishop of Regensburg.

He was an expert in church history and did work as an editor for several encyclopedic books on this subject, in which he also wrote articles himself. He was the editor of the Kirchliches Handlexikon (1904-1912), and between 1930 and 1938, he was the editor of the Lexikon für Theologie und Kirche, which in 10 volumes contained 8,000 articles.

In both publications, he showcases "Christian" antisemitism. 

After the war, Buchberger was active in rebuilding the diocese. Immediately after the end of the war in 1945, 95 charitable institutions were founded by him. 

In the following years, 175 new churches were built on his initiative. In 1950 on the occasion of the Christian Jubilee, Pope Pius XII made him an Archbishop.

Buchberger was an honorary member of a Catholic Corporation, Katholische Studentenverbindung Südmark (Akademischer Görresverein) in Munich, which is member of the Kartellverband katholischer deutscher Studentenvereine (KV).

Awards
 1950: personal rank of archbishop by Pius XII
 1953: Großes Verdienstkreuz mit Stern und Schulterband of the German Federal Republic

Bibliography
 
 Josef Staber: Kirchengeschichte des Bistums Regensburg. Regensburg 1966. S. 200-205.

References

External links

 Works on and by Michael Buchberger in the Deutschen Nationalbibliothek
 Entry for Michael Buchberger on catholic-hierarchy.org
 Image of Michael Buchberger

1874 births
1961 deaths
Roman Catholic bishops of Regensburg
Grand Crosses with Star and Sash of the Order of Merit of the Federal Republic of Germany
Antisemitism in Germany